Elsa Matilde Zardini (born 1949) is an Argentinian/Paraguayan botanist, teacher, curator, and explorer. She has made botanical expeditions in the US, Brazil, Argentina, Paraguay. Three botanical taxon names were authored by Zardini. Her specialization is the flora of the Plata basin, with an emphasis on that of Paraguay.

Early life and education 

In 1973 Zardini earned a Masters in Science, and in 1974 a PhD, both at the National University of La Plata in Buenos Aires, Argentina.

Career 
Zardini is one of the disciples of the Argentinian botanist Ángel Lulio Cabrera among them: Genoveva Dawson, Otto Solbrig, Jorge Morello, Humberto A. Fabris  (1924-1976), Delia Abbiatti, Noemí Correa, Delia Añón Suárez, Cristina Orsi, Amelia Torres, Aída Pontiroli, Jorge Crisci, Roberto Kiesling and Fernando Zuloaga. 2011: she became associate curator of the Missouri Botanical Garden. Spermatophytes was an area of interest for her.

Publications 
Flora of the Guianas Onagraceae. . Zardini, Elsa M,j. Jansen-Jacobs, peter h. Raven. 1991.e. Vol. 10. Ed. Koeltz

American Cucurbitaceae useful to man: Whitaker, Thomas of the United States Department of Agriculture, Zardini, E.M.  La Plata, October 7 to 14, 1980. Ed. Province of Buenos Aires Commission of Investigations Scientists,

Plants named for Zardini 

Zardini named the plant taxa Lulia, Lulia nervosa, and Trichocline deserticola.

References

1949 births
Living people
Paraguayan botanists
Women botanists
20th-century Argentine botanists
20th-century women scientists
21st-century Argentine botanists
21st-century Argentine women scientists
Paraguayan expatriates in the United States
National University of La Plata alumni
Paraguayan women scientists
Ethnobotanists